One Nite in Mongkok is a 2004 Hong Kong crime thriller film written and directed by Derek Yee and starring Daniel Wu, Cecilia Cheung and Alex Fong. The film is a sequel to the Yee-produced 2000 film Double Tap, with Fong reprising his role from the previous installment. A sequel to the film, Triple Tap, was released in 2010, which was once again directed by Yee and featured Fong reprising his role, while also starring Wu in a different role.

The Mainland Chinese release adds an inter-title notice stating that the film took place in 1996, the final year of British Hong Kong, to promote the idea that vice and immorality characterised earlier eras before the People's Republic of China established sovereignty.

Cast
 Daniel Wu as Lin Lai-fu 		
 Cecilia Cheung as Dandan 
 Alex Fong as Milo / Miu Chi-sun
 Anson Leung as Beel
 Chin Ka-lok as Brandon
 Cha Chuen-yee as Head of Anti-vice Unit
 Alexander Chan as Wah
 Monica Chan as Milo's wife
 Paul Che as Shitty Kong
 Henry Fong as Carl
 Christie Fung as Sue
 Cynthia Ho as Jane
 Elena Kong as Nightclub Lady
 Lam Suet as Liu
 Lawrence Lau as Fatty – nightclub manager
 Sam Lee as Franky
 Ng Shui-ting as Kinson
 Paw Hee-ching as Volunteer helper at Sue's home
 Eddie Pang as Tiger
 Sun Limin as Tim
 Redbean Lau as Tim's wife
 Austin Wai as Milo's superior
 Ken Wong as Wilson

Awards and nominations

References

External links
 
 hkcinemagic entry
 One Nite in Mongkok at hkmdb.com

2004 films
2004 crime thriller films
Hong Kong crime thriller films
Triad films
Police detective films
2000s Cantonese-language films
Films directed by Derek Yee
Films about contract killing
Films set in Hong Kong
Films shot in Hong Kong
2000s Hong Kong films